Stefanie Thurmann (born 25 March 1982 in Perleberg, Brandenburg) is a German sport shooter. She won a bronze medal in the women's sport pistol at the 2009 ISSF World Cup series in Changwon, South Korea, accumulating a score of 787.2 points.

Thurmann represented Germany at the 2008 Summer Olympics in Beijing, where she competed in the women's 25 m pistol, along with her teammate Munkhbayar Dorjsuren, who eventually won the bronze medal in the final. She finished only in twenty-third place by one point ahead of Italy's Maura Genovesi from the final attempt, for a total score of 576 points (291 in the precision stage and 285 in the rapid fire).

References

External links
  
 
 
 

German female sport shooters
Living people
Olympic shooters of Germany
Shooters at the 2008 Summer Olympics
People from Perleberg
1982 births
Shooters at the 2015 European Games
European Games competitors for Germany
Sportspeople from Brandenburg
20th-century German women
21st-century German women